Pleasant Grove is a census-designated place (CDP) in Muskingum County, Ohio, United States. The population was 2,016 at the 2000 census.

Geography
Pleasant Grove is located at  (39.944835, -81.965835).

Demographics

As of the census of 2000, there were 2,016 people, 728 households, and 516 families residing in the CDP. The population density was 631.4 people per square mile (244.0/km). There were 765 housing units at an average density of 239.6/sq mi (92.6/km). The racial makeup of the CDP was 96.18% White, 2.48% African American, 0.10% Native American, 0.25% Asian, 0.10% Pacific Islander, 0.20% from other races, and 0.69% from two or more races. Hispanic or Latino of any race were 0.35% of the population.

There were 728 households, out of which 30.8% had children under the age of 18 living with them, 54.1% were married couples living together, 11.4% had a female householder with no husband present, and 29.0% were non-families. 23.4% of all households were made up of individuals, and 7.3% had someone living alone who was 65 years of age or older. The average household size was 2.39 and the average family size was 2.81.

In the CDP, the population was spread out, with 20.0% under the age of 18, 7.7% from 18 to 24, 24.2% from 25 to 44, 23.7% from 45 to 64, and 24.4% who were 65 years of age or older. The median age was 43 years. For every 100 females, there were 87.4 males. For every 100 females age 18 and over, there were 83.2 males.

The median income for a household in the CDP was $34,728, and the median income for a family was $46,250. Males had a median income of $32,379 versus $19,034 for females. The per capita income for the CDP was $16,761. About 12.6% of families and 11.3% of the population were below the poverty line, including 13.2% of those under age 18 and 6.5% of those age 65 or over.

Notable residents
Ernest Glenn Munn - aviator

References

Census-designated places in Muskingum County, Ohio
Census-designated places in Ohio